The Making of Bread Act 1800, also called the Making of Bread, etc. Act 1800 and more formally the Act 41 Geo. III c. 16, was an Act of the Parliament of Great Britain that prohibited millers from producing any flour other than wholemeal flour.

Background 
The Act was introduced as one of a series of measures to deal with a severe food shortage, caused at least partly by the poor wheat harvest of 1799. Labourers and their families at that time lived very largely on bread, the price of which could account for more than half of their weekly wages.

The Act 
The Act directed that only wholemeal flour was to be produced.

Effect 
The Act proved to be very unpopular, and impossible to enforce. So concerned was the government by the civil unrest that resulted, the Act was repealed after less than two months. One account from Horsham, in Sussex, demonstrates the depth of public feeling:

See also 

 Making of Bread Act 1757

References

Citations

Notes

Bibliography 

 

Repealed Great Britain Acts of Parliament
Great Britain Acts of Parliament 1800